National Route 14 (officially, PY14) is one of the northernmost highways of all Paraguay's 22 national routes, which connects towns in northern Alto Paraguay department.

History
With the Resolution N° 1090/19, it obtained its current number and elevated to National Route in 2019 by the MOPC (Ministry of Public Works and Communications).

Distances, cities and towns

The following table shows the distances traversed by PY14 in each different department, showing cities and towns that it passes by (or near).

References

14